Cotonopsis is a genus of sea snails, marine gastropod molluscs in the family Columbellidae, the dove snails.

Species
Species within the genus Cotonopsis include:
 Cotonopsis argentea (Houbrick, 1983)
 Cotonopsis crassiparva Jung, 1989
 Cotonopsis deroyae (Emerson & d'Attilio, 1969)
 Cotonopsis filbyi (G. B. Sowerby III, 1888)
 Cotonopsis hirundo (Gaskoin, 1851)
 Cotonopsis jaliscana Jung, 1989
 Cotonopsis lafresnayi (P. Fischer & Bernardi, 1857)
 Cotonopsis lindae (Petuch, 1989)
 Cotonopsis mendozana (Shasky, 1970)
 Cotonopsis monfilsi (Emerson, 1993)
 Cotonopsis panacostaricensis (Olsson, 1942)
 Cotonopsis phuketensis (Kosuge, Roussy & Muangman, 1998)
 Cotonopsis pointieri Pelorce, 2020
 Cotonopsis radwini Jung, 1989
 Cotonopsis saintpairiana (Caillet, 1864)
 Cotonopsis semistriata Pelorce, 2020
 Cotonopsis serratisutura Pelorce, 2020
 Cotonopsis skoglundae Jung, 1989
 Cotonopsis suteri Jung, 1989
 Cotonopsis turrita (G.B. Sowerby I, 1832)
 Species brought into synonymy
 Cotonopsis allaryi Bozzetti, 2010: synonym of Cotonopsis saintpairiana (Caillet, 1864)
 Cotonopsis edentula (Dall, 1908): synonym of Cotonopsis filbyi (G. B. Sowerby III, 1888)
 Cotonopsis vanwalleghemi Kronenberg & Dekker, 1998: synonym of Cotonopsis phuketensis (Kosuge, Roussy & Muangman, 1998)

References

 Jung P. (1989) Revision of the Strombina-Group (Gastropoda: Columbellidae), fossil and living. Schweizerische Paläontologische Abhandlungen 111: 1-298

External links
 

Columbellidae